Karbonite gears are a reinforced plastic composite material used  in Hitec RC servos that show almost five times the strength of nylon gears and better wear resistance. Cycle times of over 300,000 have been observed, with these gear trains showing virtually no wear. Karbonite-geared servos are more expensive than nylon ones but are highly durable.  Hobbyists are advised to avoid thread locking compounds on Karbonite as this will cause the plastic to fail.

See also
 Carbonite (disambiguation), the name of several substances, both real and fictional.
 Radio Control, remote controlled model vehicles.

References

Gears
Materials